Bündock is a Canadian band from Montreal, Quebec, active during the 1980s. They created songs in both English and French.

History
Bündock was formed in 1979 in Grand-Mère, Quebec (later Shawinigan).   The band moved to Montreal in 1983 and soon began writing songs in English. The band released an EP, Mauve, in 1986. They scored a minor hit in Canada in 1987 with "American Singer", a tribute to Jim Morrison, which peaked at #72 in the RPM100. The EP also featured the song "Come On (Baby Tonight)", a duet with Sass Jordan.

In 1988 their single "Season for Love" appeared on the RPM CanCon charts.  That year they also released the album Société Anonyme, and toured to support the album as an opening act for The Box. The album was a Prix Félix finalist for English Album of the Year in 1988.

They followed up with the French-language album Cinéma in 1989.

Bündock disbanded in 1989. Marc Gendron became a record producer, musical director and bass player  for many artists including French Star Natasha St-Pier, Cindy Bédard and Orloge Simard. Roussel went on to teach high school French at École Secondaire Monseigneur-Richard, in Verdun, Montreal. Pierre Bundock became a multimedia instructor in the Collège Édouard-Montpetit, in Longueuil.

On November 11, 2009, the band reunited for a new Christmas album called Joyeux Noël. The album featured original band members, and also violinist Mara Tremblay, Marie Bernard and Elle.

Members
Pierre Bundock - vocals
Dominique Lanois - guitar
Marc Gendron - bass (1963-2018)
Alain Roussel - drums (1979-1994)
Antoine Mainguy - drums (2009)

Discography

Albums
Mauve (Alert) – 1986
Société Anonyme (Alert) – 1988

Cinéma (Alert) 1989

Joyeux Noël - 2009

Singles
American Singer [purple vinyl 7"] (Alert) – 1987
Le Corbeau/Come On Baby Tonight [12"] (Alert) – 1987
Tied For Time (Alert) – 1988
Never Trust (Alert) – 1988

Videos
American Singer – 1987
Le Corbeau – 1987
Tied For Time – 1988

References

External links
Bündock Official site

Canadian folk rock groups
Shawinigan
Musical groups established in 1979
Musical groups disestablished in 1994
1979 establishments in Quebec
1994 disestablishments in Quebec
English-language musical groups from Quebec